Nannotinea is a genus of moths belonging to the family Tineidae.

Species
Nannotinea holovalva	Gozmány, 1968
Nannotinea simplex	Gozmány, 1966

References
Original publication in: Gozmány L. A. 1966c. A Tineid material (Lepidoptera) from Bangui, Central African Republic. - Acta Zoologica Academiae Scientiarum Hungaricae 12(3–4):251–266.

Meessiinae